Rotaria is a genus of asexual, microscopic animal known as a bdelloid rotifer. Analysis published in 2007 of morphology and DNA sequence data of species from the genus confirmed that despite their asexual mechanism of reproduction, two fundamental properties of species, independent evolution and ecological divergence by natural selection occurred. This demonstrates that sex is not a necessary condition for speciation.

References

Bdelloidea
Rotifer genera